Crystal is a first-ring suburban city in Hennepin County, Minnesota, United States that is about 5 miles from Downtown Minneapolis. The population was 23,330 at the 2020 census. Minnesota State Highway 100 and County Road 81 are two of the main routes in the city.

Geography

City routes include Douglas Drive North, 36th Avenue North, 42nd Avenue North, and Bass Lake Road.

Crystal Airport, a small general aviation field, is located within the city limits.

The city is bordered on the north by the city of Brooklyn Park, on the northeast by Brooklyn Center, on the east by Robbinsdale, on the south by Golden Valley, and on the west by New Hope.

The City of Crystal has more than 240 acres dedicated to parks and open space.  The city maintains 26 parks as well as numerous ball fields, courts, playgrounds, trails and activity areas.  The Crystal Community Center features an outdoor aquatic center,  skate park and little league baseball complex.

Crystal has been awarded the "Minnesota Star City" designation for economic development.

Demographics

2010 census
As of the census of 2010, there were 22,151 people, 9,183 households, and 5,640 families living in the city. The racial makeup of the city was 78.1% White, 10.5% African American, 0.7% Native American, 3.9% Asian, 3.0% from other races, and 3.8% from two or more races. Hispanic or Latino of any race were 6.5% of the population.

There were 9,183 households, of which 28.5% had children under the age of 18 living with them, 43.8% were married couples living together, 12.7% had a female householder with no husband present, 5.0% had a male householder with no wife present, and 38.6% were non-families. 30.3% of all households were made up of individuals, and 10.3% had someone living alone who was 65 years of age or older. The average household size was 2.39 and the average family size was 2.97.

The median age in the city was 38.1 years. 21.6% of residents were under the age of 18; 7.8% were between the ages of 18 and 24; 30.7% were from 25 to 44; 26.5% were from 45 to 64; and 13.7% were 65 years of age or older. The gender makeup of the city was 49.2% male and 50.8% female.

2000 census
As of the census of 2000, there were 22,698 people, 9,389 households, and 6,102 families living in the city. The racial makeup of the city was 88.34% White, 4.20% African American, 0.59% Native American, 3.44% Asian, 0.02% Pacific Islander, 1.03% from other races, and 2.39% from two or more races. Hispanic or Latino of any race were 2.51% of the population.

There were 9,389 households, out of which 28.3% had children under the age of 18 living with them, 49.9% were married couples living together, 11.1% had a female householder with no husband present, and 35.0% were non-families. 27.5% of all households were made up of individuals, and 8.9% had someone living alone who was 65 years of age or older.  The average household size was 2.39 and the average family size was 2.92.

In the city, the population was spread out, with 22.4% under the age of 18, 7.2% from 18 to 24, 34.6% from 25 to 44, 21.6% from 45 to 64, and 14.1% who were 65 years of age or older.  The median age was 37 years. For every 100 females, there were 97.3 males.  For every 100 females age 18 and over, there were 93.8 males.

The median income for a household in the city was $48,736, and the median income for a family was $54,738. Males had a median income of $39,494 versus $29,673 for females. The per capita income for the city was $23,163.  About 2.5% of families and 4.4% of the population were below the poverty line, including 5.7% of those under age 18 and 3.6% of those age 65 or over.

Government
The City of Crystal has a council–manager form of government. Under this plan, the elected members of the council set the policies for the operation of the city. The council hires a city manager, who is responsible for the administration of all city business. The city council members are elected on a nonpartisan basis.

The city council consists of seven members, which include a mayor and six council members. The current mayor is Jim Adams, whose term expires at the end of 2024. Current council members are John Budziszewski, David Cummings, Forest Eidbo, Traci Kamish, Therese Kiser, Nancy LaRoche.

Crystal is located in Minnesota's 5th congressional district, represented by Ilhan Omar, a Democrat.

Education
Crystal is serviced by the Robbinsdale School District. And Osseo Area Schools ISD 279

Notable people

 Tom Dooher – former president of Education Minnesota, was born in Crystal.
 Todd Richards – former head coach of the Columbus Blue Jackets of the National Hockey League.
 Travis Richards - former NHL player.
 Jeff Schuh – former NFL player, was born in Crystal.

References

External links
 Crystal, MN – Official City Website

 
Cities in Minnesota
Cities in Hennepin County, Minnesota
Populated places established in 1866
1866 establishments in Minnesota